Jermaine Anderson may refer to:
 Jermaine Anderson (basketball) (born 1983), Canadian basketball player
 Jermaine Anderson (English footballer) (born 1996)
 Jermaine Anderson (Jamaican footballer) (born 1979)